Isfahan Province Governorate is the representative office of Government of Islamic Republic of Iran in Isfahan province. Its secretariat is located in Isfahan city.

Administration 
Isfahan is in region two according to regions of Iran.In May 2020 in Islamic Consultative Assembly there was a discussion that counties, Kashan, Khansar, Naein, Golpayegan, Ardestan, Aran va bidgol, Natanz and Khur and biabanak, seceded create a North Isfahan Province called Golsaran.

See also 

 Category:Cities in Isfahan Province
 List of cities, towns and villages in Isfahan Province

References

External links 

 http://isfahan.gov.ir/

Isfahan Province
Isfahan